Sagay Broadcasting Corporation is a Philippine radio network. Its main headquarters are located at 2/F, La Castill Bldg., Magsaysay St., Brgy. Zone 1, Digos. SBC operates a number of stations across the country under the Muews Radio brand.

Stations

Muews Radio

Kakampi TV

Former Stations

References

Radio stations in the Philippines
Philippine radio networks
Mass media companies established in 1995